Kames  may refer to:
People
 Henry Home, Lord Kames, Scottish philosopher
 Abdesalam Kames, Libyan footballer
 Bob Kames, American organist
 Kambūjia, otherwise Cambyses of Persia
 Kamose, last Egyptian pharaoh of the Seventeenth dynasty of Egypt
Places
 Kames, Argyll, Scotland
Other
 plural of kame, a glacial feature